KLPD-LD, virtual channel 28 (UHF digital channel 30), is a low-powered independent television station licensed to Denver, Colorado, United States. The station is owned by Syncom Media Group.

Digital channels
The station's digital channel is multiplexed:

References

External links

LPD-LD
Low-power television stations in the United States